"Come On In (You Did the Best You Could Do)" is a song written by Rick Giles and George Green, and recorded by American country music group The Oak Ridge Boys.  It was released in November 1985 as the third single from the album Step On Out.  The song reached number 3 on the Billboard Hot Country Singles & Tracks chart. The song was also recorded by Oak Ridge Boy William Lee Golden on his 1986 solo album American Vagabond.

It is not to be confused with the band's 1978 single "Come On In".

Chart performance

References

1986 singles
1985 songs
The Oak Ridge Boys songs
Songs written by Rick Giles
Song recordings produced by Ron Chancey
MCA Records singles